This is a complete list of members of the United States Senate during the 6th United States Congress listed by seniority, from March 4, 1799, to March 3, 1801.

Seniority rules
A Chronological List of United States Senators includes the following explanation of how it assigns seniority.

From 1789 to 1958, senators whose terms began on the same day are listed alphabetically. Beginning in 1959, senators are listed according to commencement of first Senate term by order of service, determined by former service in order as senator, vice president, House member, cabinet secretary, governor, and then by state population. This latter system for calculating order of service has been used by the modern Senate for many years for the purposes of office assignment. It is unclear just when the Senate first began applying such criteria.  

Rank column: This consecutively numbers senators, serving in the relevant Congress, according to seniority in that Congress. Seniority is based upon the method used by the chronological list. If the senator is not the first person to hold the seat, no number is included in the list.

A senator with broken service is placed before other senators starting service on the same day, but after senators with unbroken service starting before that date.

Senate No. column: The chronological guide gives an official number to each senator. This is the number set out in this column. That number is retained even if the senator has broken service.

As an historical article, the states and party affiliations listed reflect those during the Congress. Seats and party affiliations on similar lists for other Congresses will be different for certain members. During this Congress, there were two parties represented. Senators are classified as Democratic-Republican (DR) or Federalist (F).

Terms of service

U.S. Senate seniority list

Notes

See also
6th United States Congress
List of members of the United States House of Representatives in the 6th Congress by seniority

External links

Senate Journal, First Forty-three Sessions of Congress
List of members of the 6th Congress

006